Paul Cooper is the current editor in chief of the Australian Journal of Zoology. He is also currently Associate Professor, in the College of Medicine, Biology and Environment of Australian National University (1987–present).

Background
He received his PhD from UCLA by investigating water balance in desert beetles. He obtained postdoctoral positions at University of Tennessee-Knoxville, University of Arizona and University of British Columbia and La Trobe University. Directly following this last position, in 1987 he was appointed as a contract lecturer at Australian National University. Dr. Cooper has lectured in physiological, behavioral and introductory ecology; invertebrate and vertebrate zoology; entomology; and present day courses in physiology. He has received a 2015 Award for Excellence in Education, awarded by the ANU Colleges of Science. Dr. Cooper's areas of expertise are: Life histories, Crop and pasture protection (pests, diseases and weeds), Invertebrate biology, Comparative physiology, Animal neurobiology, Animal physiology biophysics, as well as Animal physiology systems.

References

Australian scientists
University of California, Los Angeles alumni
Academic staff of the Australian National University
Australian zoologists
Living people
Year of birth missing (living people)